Zordan is an Italian surname. Notable people with the surname include:

Andrea Zordan (born 1992), Italian racing cyclist
Luca Zordan, Italian photographer

See also
 Zoran
 Zordon, a fictional character from the Power Rangers franchise

Italian-language surnames